Bergen Rugbyklubb is a Norwegian rugby club based in Bergen. They currently compete in the Norway Rugby Championship.

History
The club was founded in 1999 by Matthew Billingham and also won their first championship title that same year. The club has since its creation been one of the more successful sides in Norway featuring in the final of the championship on several occasions.

Honours
Norway Rugby Championship
Champions
1999, 2009
Runner-up
2012
NM VII's
Champions
2012
Runner-up

Current squad

Former players

References

External links
 Bergen Rugbyklubb

Norwegian rugby union teams
Rugby clubs established in 1999
Sport in Bergen
1999 establishments in Norway